Greatest Hits is a greatest hits album by American R&B/soul singer Luther Vandross, released in 1999 (see 1999 in music).

Track listing
"Never Too Much" – 3:51
"Don't Want to Be a Fool" – 4:35
"Here and Now" – 5:22
"Love the One You're With" – 5:03
"Any Love" – 5:00
"Superstar/Until You Come Back to Me (That's What I'm Gonna Do)" – 9:15
"A House Is Not a Home" – 7:07
"Give Me the Reason" – 4:45
"There's Nothing Better Than Love" (with Gregory Hines) – 4:42
"Creepin'" – 4:04
"So Amazing" – 3:39
"Stop to Love" – 5:10
"Power of Love/Love Power" – 6:41
"How Many Times Can We Say Goodbye" (with Dionne Warwick) – 3:25

1999 greatest hits albums
Albums produced by Luther Vandross
Albums produced by Walter Afanasieff
Luther Vandross compilation albums
Epic Records compilation albums